Apsara International Air  was an airline operated between Phnom Penh and Siem Reap, from 2013 to 2016.

History
Apsara Air began operations with its inaugural flight on 8 October 2014 between Phnom Penh and Siem Reap.

Destinations
Cambodia
Siem Reap (Siem Reap International Airport), hub
Phnom Penh (Phnom Penh International Airport)
Preah Sihanouk (Sihanoukville International Airport)

Fleet
As of January 2017 Apsara International Air does not operate any aircraft.

See also

 Transport in Cambodia
 List of airlines of Cambodia

References

Defunct airlines of Cambodia
Airlines established in 2013
Airlines disestablished in 2016
Government-owned airlines
Cambodian companies established in 2013